Kaine is a surname. Notable people with the surname include:

 Bill Kaine (1900–1968), English professional footballer
 Carmel Kaine (1937–2013), Australian classical violinist
 Jaiden Kaine, Cuban-American actor
 John Charles Kaine (1854–1923), Quebec politician
 Laurie Kaine (born 1952), Australian rules footballer
 Les Kaine (1936–2012), Australian rules footballer
 Obregon Kaine, main character in the comic book series Negation
 Tim Kaine (born 1958), American politician and 2016 Democratic Party Vice Presidential nominee
 Trevor Kaine (1928–2008), Australian politician
 Whitney Kaine (born 1956), American model

See also
 Kaine (disambiguation)
 Kane (disambiguation)
 Caine (disambiguation)